Karl Huber (18 October 1915 in Canton of St. Gallen, Switzerland – 16 September 2002) was a Swiss politician and civil servant. He was a member of the Christian Democratic People's Party of Switzerland (CVP).

After finishing his studies at Saint-Gall, he pursued legal studies at the University of Bern where he obtained his doctorate in 1939. In 1941 he became a legal collaborator with the Department of the Economy. In 1954 he was named to the general secretariat of the federal Department of the Economy, where he served from 1957 until 1967.

In 1967, he was elected Chancellor of the Confederation. The "magic formula" was applicable for the first time to the Chancellery as his Vice-Chancellors included the radical Jean-Marc Sauvant and the socialist Walter Buser.

Following his appointment, Huber reduced and streamlined the Council's decision-making process. He standardized the presentation of files, prescribed rules for the presentation of legislation, developed the first guidelines for the coming parliamentary term, and advocated for the search of consensual solutions by the four government parties. These reforms were formalized in the 1978 law on the organization of the administration. Political rights are condensed into a single law approved by referendum on 4 December 1977.

Huber retired in 1981, after which the University of Fribourg awarded him an honorary doctorate.

References

Federal Chancellors of Switzerland
1915 births
2002 deaths
20th-century Swiss politicians